Clover Bar Bridge and Beverly Bridge are a pair of bridges that span the North Saskatchewan River in the city of Edmonton, Alberta, Canada. The twin spans carry 6 lanes total of Yellowhead Trail, the name given to Alberta Highway 16 within Edmonton city limits.

Clover Bar Bridge, the original truss span, was completed in the summer of 1953 and connected Beverly with mostly rural Strathcona County. Beverly was amalgamated with the City of Edmonton eight years later. Once the original span could no longer handle traffic volume, a steel girder bridge was built just to the south to carry eastbound traffic. This bridge, completed in 1972 is called the Beverly Bridge.

The Clover Bar Railway Bridge is just to the north of the original span.

See also 
 List of crossings of the North Saskatchewan River
 List of bridges in Canada

References

Bridges in Edmonton
Bridges on the Trans-Canada Highway
Road bridges in Alberta